The 2010–11 season was Lecce's 102nd in existence. Lecce returned to the top flight of Italian football, for the first time since the 2005–06 season after completing the 2009–10 Serie B season in first place.

Pre-season and friendlies

Lecce began a pre-season training camp in Tarvisio on July 15.

1 45 minute matches played during "Memorial Gaetano Michetti".

Serie A
Lecce will return to Serie A action on August 29.  They will start the season away to Milan.

League table

Coppa Italia
Based on their finish in the 2009-10 Serie B season, Lecce will enter the 2010–11 Coppa Italia in the third round.  Their first opponent in the competition will be Serie B club Siena.

Squad statistics

|}

Transfers

In

References

2010-11
Italian football clubs 2010–11 season